G/T mismatch-specific thymine DNA glycosylase is an enzyme that in humans is encoded by the TDG gene. Several bacterial proteins have strong sequence homology with this protein.

Function 

The protein encoded by this gene belongs to the TDG/mug DNA glycosylase family. Thymine-DNA glycosylase (TDG) removes thymine moieties from G/T mismatches by hydrolyzing the carbon-nitrogen bond between the sugar-phosphate backbone of DNA and the mispaired thymine. With lower activity, this enzyme also removes thymine from C/T and T/T mispairings. TDG can also remove uracil and 5-bromouracil from mispairings with guanine. TDG knockout mouse models showed no increase in mispairing frequency suggesting that other enzymes, like the functional homologue MBD4, may provide functional redundancy.  This gene may have a pseudogene in the p arm of chromosome 12.

Additionally, in 2011, the human thymine DNA glycosylase (hTDG) was reported to efficiently excise 5-formylcytosine (5fC) and 5-carboxylcytosine (5caC), the key oxidation products of 5-methylcytosine in genomic DNA. Later on, the crystal structure of the hTDG catalytic domain in complex with duplex DNA containing 5caC was published, which supports the role of TDG in mammalian 5-methylcytosine demethylation.

Interactions 

Thymine-DNA glycosylase has been shown to interact with:
 CREB-binding protein,
 Estrogen receptor alpha,
 Promyelocytic leukemia protein,
 SUMO3, and
 Small ubiquitin-related modifier 1.

Interactive pathway map

References

Further reading

EC 3.2.2